"Show Me the Wonder" is a song by Welsh alternative rock band Manic Street Preachers. It was released as the lead single from the band's eleventh studio album, Rewind the Film, on 9 September 2013.

Critical reception
The song received positive reviews. Jamie Milton of This Is Fake DIY called the song "a triumphant, brass-led addition to the record." David Owens of Western Mail described the song as "a brass-infused soul pop standard recalling Dexys Midnight Runners and the heady days of Motown," while inferring that "the new album sees the band utilising a more reflective, stripped-back sound." Fact magazine wrote: "notably more buoyant than ‘Rewind The Film’, the song features some chirpy horn backing and a turn on the trumpet from Manics drummer Sean Moore." Michelle Geslani of Consequence of Sound also noted the brass section, further commenting that "the band seeks inspiration and a little awe out of life." Contactmusic.com stated that "the song is an upbeat, positive pop song but with questioning lyrics," while further elaborating that "the soaring horns and a joyous chorus makes it a stand out track on what is otherwise a delicate record."

Notes
The song's lyrics appear to be at least partially derived from the Manics' 2001 single "Found That Soul," which begins with the words "Show me a wonder."

Music video
The music video for the song features Craig Roberts of Skins and new actress Tori Lyons from South Wales. It was released on 29 July 2013. It features the band performing live "in an old-fashioned pub." It was filmed at the Pioneer Workingmen's Club in Porth, Rhondda Valleys in South Wales.

The video, directed Kieran Evans, won the award for 'Best Video' at the 2013 Q Awards.

Track listing

Personnel 

 Manic Street Preachers

 James Dean Bradfield – lead vocals, lead and rhythm guitar
 Nicky Wire – bass guitar
 Sean Moore – drums

Other personnel
 Gavin Fitzjohn - horn arrangement, baritone and tenor saxophone, trumpet
 John Rey - piano
 Alex Silva - production
 Loz Williams - production

Charts

References

External links
 

2013 singles
2013 songs
Manic Street Preachers songs
Columbia Records singles
Songs written by James Dean Bradfield
Songs written by Nicky Wire
Songs written by Sean Moore (musician)